Ivan Dimitrov may refer to:

 Ivan Dimitrov (figure skater) (born 1986), Bulgarian figure skater
 Ivan Dimitrov (footballer) (1935–2019), Bulgarian football defender
 Ivan Dimitrov (sport shooter) (born 1973), Bulgarian sports shooter
 Ivan Dimitrov (volleyball) (born 1952), Bulgarian volleyball player